Mt. Olivet Episcopal Church and Cemetery is an historic Carpenter Gothic style Episcopal Church building and its adjoining cemetery located at 335 Main Street in Pineville, Louisiana, United States. 

It was added to the National Register of Historic Places on June 22, 2000. Mt. Olivet is no longer a parish church and is now Mount Olivet Chapel. Its parish hall is now the Diocesan House of the Episcopal Diocese of Western Louisiana.

Notable interments
 George Washington Bolton (1841–1931), state politician and banker
 Henry E. Hardtner (1870–1935), businessman and conservationist
 Thomas Overton Moore (1804–1876), Louisiana Governor
 John H. Overton (1875–1948), U.S. Representative and Senator

References

External links

 Mt. Olivet Chapel & Cemetery History
 Mt. Olivet: Restoration
 

Churches on the National Register of Historic Places in Louisiana
Carpenter Gothic church buildings in Louisiana
Churches completed in 1858
Episcopal church buildings in Louisiana
19th-century Episcopal church buildings
Anglican cemeteries in the United States
Cemeteries in Louisiana
Churches in Rapides Parish, Louisiana
Pineville, Louisiana
National Register of Historic Places in Rapides Parish, Louisiana
1858 establishments in Louisiana